François Van Vlaslaer (born 4 April 1897, date of death unknown) was a French racing cyclist who rode in the 1929 Tour de France.

References

External links
 

1897 births
Year of death missing
French male cyclists
Place of birth missing